Major General Paul Bruce Symon,  (born 1960) is the Director-General of the Australian Secret Intelligence Service since 18 December 2017. A retired senior Australian Army officer, Symon served as Director of the Defence Intelligence Organisation from 2011 to 2014 and as Deputy Chief of Army from 2009 to 2011.

Military career
Symon was educated at Scotch College, Melbourne and entered the Royal Military College, Duntroon, as an Australian Army officer cadet in 1979, and was allotted to Kokoda Company. In his final year at Duntroon in 1982 he was the senior cadet – Battalion Sergeant Major – and graduated as the recipient of the Sword of Honour. Symon was allotted to the Royal Regiment of Australian Artillery (RAA) and over his career saw service with the gunners in many postings, culminating in command of the 1st Field Regiment, Royal Australian Artillery in 1998 to 1999.

Symon served on four operational deployments. His most important joint command was in late 2005 until mid-2006 when appointed Commander Middle East (Joint Task Force 633). This appointment gave him national command responsibility for all Australian soldiers, sailors and airmen/women in Iraq and Afghanistan. His command coincided with Australia's only death in Iraq, that of Private Jake Kovco.

Symon advised the United Nations Special Representative in East Timor in the four months prior to the deployment of International Force for East Timor, known as INTERFET. This entailed close liaison with the Indonesian military, Falintil and militia leaders prior to, during, and after the vote for independence in 1999. For his leadership in East Timor and in command, he was appointed a Member of the Order of Australia in the 2000 Birthday Honours.

In 1997 he served with the United Nations Truce Supervision Organization in a period of great tension between Hezbollah and the Israeli Defence Force. And in 2003, he was appointed as the senior military adviser for the Regional Assistance Mission to Solomon Islands It was in this period that a significant number of militia leaders were jailed and a very successful gun amnesty organised.

Symon has taught at the Royal Military Academy Sandhurst in the UK, and has served as Army's Director-General of Personnel, Director-General of Preparedness and Plans and Deputy Chief of Army. He has also served as Director-General Pacific in International Policy Division and Chief of Staff of Army's 1st Division in Brisbane.

Academically, Symon holds two Master's degrees: from Deakin University and from the University of New South Wales. He is a graduate of Australian Command and Staff College and of the Centre for Defence and Strategic Studies in Canberra.

Symon was appointed an Officer of the Order of Australia in the 2007 Australia Day Honours in recognition of his operational service in the Middle East.

Personal life
Symon is married to Kate and they have two children. He enjoys running half marathons and sharing the company of his family and friends.

Symon has a strong liking for singer-songwriter Adele, AFL club Carlton, and poetry.

References

1960 births
Academics of the Royal Military Academy Sandhurst
Australian generals
Military personnel from Melbourne
Deakin University alumni
Directors-General of the Australian Secret Intelligence Service
Living people
Officers of the Order of Australia
Royal Military College, Duntroon graduates
University of New South Wales alumni